The 2003 Speedway Conference League was the third tier/division of British speedway.

Summary
The title was won by Mildenhall Fen Tigers.

Final league table

Conference League Knockout Cup
The 2003 Conference League Knockout Cup was the sixth edition of the Knockout Cup for tier three teams. Mildenhall Fen Tigers were the winners.

Semi-finals

Final

Other Honours
Conference Trophy - Boston Barracuda-Braves
Conference league fours - Rye House 30, Mildenhall 29, Peterborough 19, Boston 14
Conference League Riders' Championship - Barrie Evans (Rye House)

See also
List of United Kingdom Speedway League Champions

References

Conference
Speedway Conference League